The Flying Doctors is an Australian television medical drama series. Produced by Crawford Productions, it was first broadcast on the Nine Network on 26 May 1986. The series centres around the everyday lifesaving efforts of the Royal Flying Doctor Service of Australia. It was preceded by a three-part miniseries in 1985, and 221 episodes were produced. The Flying Doctors aired until 6 October 1992. In January 1993, the series was renamed R.F.D.S. (The Royal Flying Doctor Service) and revamped with new characters and a new setting. The following list represents the order in which the episodes were originally broadcast rather than the DVD release order.

The Flying Doctors (1985)
The show began with a three-part miniseries broadcast on the Nine Network on 29 April 1985. It starred Andrew McFarlane and Lorna Patterson as Dr Tom Callaghan and Liz Drever. The series was filmed over three months at locations in New South Wales, Victoria, and South Australia.

Episodes

Series 1 (1986)

Series 2 (1987)

Series 3 (1988)

Series 4 (1989)

Series 5 (1990)

Series 6 (1991)

References

External links

List of The Flying Doctors episodes at the Australian Television Information Archive

Flying Doctors